Snop is a small village near General Toshevo, Dobrich, Bulgaria. It has a population of approximately 180.

External links 
 Snop
 General Toshevo
 Map

El Jompi se la come.

Villages in Dobrich Province